Shijimia moorei, the Moore's Cupid, is a small butterfly found in India that belongs to the lycaenids or blues family. It is found from Assam to Indo China and Japan.

Taxonomy
S. m. moorei Yunnan 
S. m. taiwana Matsumura, 1919 Taiwan

Biology
The larva on feeds on Lysionotus pauciflorus

See also
List of butterflies of India (Lycaenidae)

References

External links
 台灣棋石小灰蝶 Shijimia moorei Archived link

Polyommatini
Butterflies of Asia
Taxa named by John Henry Leech
Butterflies described in 1889